The Centro Simón Bolívar Towers TCSB also known as the Towers of Silence is a building with a pair of 32-story towers, each measuring 103 meters in height, in El Silencio district, Caracas, Venezuela. Built during the time of the presidency of Marcos Pérez Jiménez, the TCSB was opened to the public on December 6, 1954.

Features
The TCSB is an example of functionalist architecture that includes the concept of integrating artistic works into the building. When first built it was a symbol of Venezuelan national identity, of a country emerging from its agrarian and petroleum-based economy, at the beginning of its industrialization. The TCSB is thus imposed as a simple aesthetic symbol of modernity and of the long-term development facing the country.

The TCSB is suspended in the air above the ground on stilts, allowing the public to traverse beneath it unhindered. The symmetry of the building is rigorous, with the twin towers arising from two parallel wings, consisting of a system of plazas, walkways, porches, doorways, commercial areas and underground parking; the Bolivar Avenue passes underneath.

The towers occupied the title of the tallest twin towers in Venezuela until the construction of the towers of Parque Central Complex along the same road in the city of Caracas.

On February 7, 1982, the climber Dan Goodwin scaled the outside of the towers using only his hands and feet.

Gallery

References

External links
 Skyscraperpage (Simon Bolivar Center 2)
 Skyscraperpage (Simon Bolivar Center 1)

Office buildings completed in 1954
Buildings and structures in Caracas
Twin towers
Skyscraper office buildings in Venezuela